Haining is a city in Zhejiang, China.

Haining may also refer to:

The Haining, Selkirk, Scotland
Hayley Haining (born 1972), British runner
Jane Haining (1897–1944), Church of Scotland missionary
Peter Haining (author) (1940–2007), British journalist, author and anthologist
Peter Haining (rower) (born 1962), Scottish rower
Robert Haining (1882–1959), British General 
Robert Haining (minister) (1802–1874), Church of Scotland minister in South Australia
Thomas Haining (1927-2005) British diplomat and ambassador to Mongolia
Will Haining (born 1982), Scottish footballer